Kristoffer Strand Ødven (born 10 February 2002) is a Norwegian footballer currently playing as a midfielder for Hødd on loan from Aalesunds FK.

Career statistics

Club

Notes

References

2002 births
Living people
Sportspeople from Ålesund
Norwegian footballers
Association football midfielders
Aalesunds FK players
IL Hødd players
Eliteserien players
Norwegian First Division players
Norwegian Second Division players